Reel Fishing: Wild, known in Japan as Fish Eyes: Wild, is a video game developed by Westone Bit Entertainment and published by Victor Interactive Software and Natsume for Dreamcast in 2001.

Reception

The game received mixed reviews according to the review aggregation website GameRankings. Anthony Chau of IGN wrote, "Reel Fishing Wild is a pretty decent fishing game that, unlike SEGA's fishing game, doesn't capture the exciting elements of fishing, but the whole fishing experience overall. That's a nice goal, but the game doesn't accomplish this with average visuals, plain play mechanics, and music that will send you to bed." Eric Bratcher of NextGen wrote, "At full price, we'd throw this one back, but Reel Fishing actually feels a lot like real fishing. For $20, it's definitely a keeper." In Japan, Famitsu gave it a score of 27 out of 40.

References

2001 video games
Dreamcast games
Dreamcast-only games
Fishing video games
Natsume (company) games
Single-player video games
Victor Interactive Software games
Video games developed in Japan
Westone Bit Entertainment games